Riyadh (lit.: 'The Gardens'  Najdi pronunciation), formerly known as Hajr al-Yamamah, is the capital and largest city of Saudi Arabia. It is also the capital of the Riyadh Province and the centre of the Riyadh Governorate.

It is the largest city on the Arabian Peninsula, and is situated in the center of the an-Nafud desert, on the eastern part of the Najd plateau. Riyadh had a population of 7.6 million people in 2019, making it the most-populous city in Saudi Arabia, 3rd most populous in the Middle East, and 38th most populous in Asia.

The first mentioning of the city by the name Riyadh was in 1590, by an early Arab chronicler. In 1737, Deham Ibn Dawwas, who was from the neighboring Manfuha, settled in and took control of the city. Deham built a wall around the city, and the best-known source of the name Riyadh is from this period, thought to be referring to the earlier oasis towns that predated the wall built by Ibn Dawwas. In 1744, Muhammad ibn 'Abd al-Wahhab formed an alliance with the Emir of Diriyah, Muhammad bin Saud, and they took Riyadh from Deham. However their state, now known as the First Saudi State, came to a collapse in 1818. Turki ibn Abdullah founded the Second Saudi State in the early 19th century and made Riyadh his capital in 1825. However, his reign over the city was disrupted by a joint Ottoman–Rashidi alliance. Finally, in the early 20th century, 'Abdulaziz ibn Saud, known in the west simply as Ibn Saud, retrieved his ancestral kingdom of Najd in 1902 and consolidated his rule by 1926 with the final Saudi conquest of Hejaz, subsequently naming his kingdom 'Saudi Arabia' in September 1932 with Riyadh as the capital.

Riyadh is the political and administrative center of Saudi Arabia. The Consultative Assembly (also known as the Shura or Shura Council), the Council of Ministers, the King and the Supreme Judicial Council are all situated in the city. Alongside these four bodies that form the core of the legal system of Saudi Arabia, the headquarters of other major and minor governmental bodies are also located in Riyadh. The city hosts 114 foreign embassies, most of which are located in the Diplomatic Quarter in the western reaches of the city.

Riyadh also holds great economic significance, as it hosts the headquarters of many banks and major companies, such as the Saudi National Bank (SNB), Al-Rajhi Bank, SABIC, Almarai, STC, and Samba Financial Group. Highway 65, known locally as the King Fahd Road, runs through some of these important centers in the city, including the King Abdullah Financial District, one of the world's largest financial districts, the Faisaliyah Center and the Kingdom Center. Riyadh is one of the world's fastest-growing cities in population and is home to many expatriates. Riyadh has been designated a global city.

The city is divided into 15 municipal districts, which are overseen by the Municipality of Riyadh headed by the mayor; and the Royal Commission for Riyadh which is chaired by the Governor of the Province, Faisal bin Bandar Al Saud. As of July 2020, the mayor is Faisal bin Abdulaziz bin Mohammed bin Ayyaf Al-Muqrin.

History

Early history
During the Pre-Islamic era the city at the site of modern Riyadh was called Hajr, and was reportedly founded by the tribe of Banu Hanifa. Hajr served as the capital of the province of Al-Yamamah, whose governors were responsible for most of central and eastern Arabia during the Umayyad and Abbasid eras. Al-Yamamah broke away from the Abbasid Empire in 866 and the area fell under the rule of the Ukhaydhirites, who moved the capital from Hajr to nearby Al-Kharj. The city then went into a long period of decline. In the 14th century, North African traveler Ibn Battuta wrote of his visit to Hajr, describing it as "the main city of Al-Yamamah, and its name is Hajr". Ibn Battuta goes on to describe it as a city of canals and trees with most of its inhabitants belonging to the Bani Hanifa, and reports that he continued on with their leader to Mecca to perform the Hajj.

Later on, Hajr broke up into several separate settlements and estates. The most notable of these were Migrin (or Muqrin) and Mi'kal, though the name Hajr continued to appear in local folk poetry. The earliest known reference to the area by the name Riyadh comes from a 17th-century chronicler reporting on an event from the year 1590. In 1737, Deham ibn Dawwas, a refugee from neighboring Manfuha, took control of Riyadh. Ibn Dawwas built a single wall to encircle the various oasis town in the area, making them effectively a single city. The name "Riyadh," meaning "gardens" refers to these earlier oasis towns.

First Saudi State

In 1744, Muhammad ibn Abdul Wahhab formed an alliance with Muhammad ibn Saud, the ruler of the nearby town of Diriyah. Ibn Saud then set out to conquer the surrounding region with the goal of bringing it under the rule of a single Islamic state. Ibn Dawwas of Riyadh led the most determined resistance, allied with forces from Al Kharj, Al Ahsa, and the Banu Yam clan of Najran. However, Ibn Dawwas fled and Riyadh capitulated to the Saudis in 1774, ending long years of wars, and leading to the declaration of the First Saudi State, with Diriyah as its capital.

The First Saudi State was destroyed by forces sent by Muhammad Ali of Egypt, acting on behalf of the Ottoman Empire. Ottoman forces razed the Saudi capital Diriyah in 1818. They had maintained a garrison at Najd. This marked the decline of the House of Saud for a short time. Turki bin Abdullah bin Muhammad became the first Amir of the Second Saudi State; the cousin of Saud bin Saud, he ruled for 19 years till 1834, leading to the consolidation of the area though they were notionally under the control of the Muhammad Ali, the Viceroy of Egypt. In 1823, Turki ibn Abdallah chose Riyadh as the new capital. Following the assassination of Turki in 1834, his eldest son Faisal killed the assassin and took control, and refused to be controlled by the Viceroy of Egypt. Najd was then invaded and Faisal was taken captive and held in Cairo. However, as Egypt became independent of the Ottoman Empire, Faisal escaped after five years of incarceration, returned to Najd and resumed his reign, ruled till 1865, and consolidated the reign of House of Saud.

Following the death of Faisal, there was rivalry among his sons which situation was exploited by Muhammad bin Rashid who took most of Najd, signed a treaty with the Ottomans, and also captured Hasa in 1871. In 1889, Abdul Rahman bin Faisal, the third son of Faisal again regained control over Najd and ruled till 1891, whereafter the control was regained by Muhammad bin Raschid.

Internecine struggles between Turki's grandsons led to the fall of the Second Saudi State in 1891 at the hand of the rival Al Rashid clan, which ruled from the northern city of Ha'il. The al-Masmak fort dates from that period.

Abdul Rahman bin Faisal al-Saud had sought refuge among a tribal community on the outskirts of Najd and then went to Kuwait with his family and stayed in exile. However, his son Abdul Aziz retrieved his ancestral kingdom of Najd in 1902 and consolidated his rule by 1926, and further expanded his kingdom to cover "most of the Arabian Peninsula." He named his kingdom as Saudi Arabia in September 1932 with Riyadh as the capital. King Abdul Aziz died in 1953 and his son Saud took control as per the established succession rule of father to son from the time Muhammad bin Saud had established the Saud rule in 1744. However, this established line of succession was broken when King Saud was succeeded by his brother King Faisal in 1964. In 1975, Faisal was succeeded by his brother King Khalid. In 1982, King Fahd took the reins from his brother. This new line of succession is among the sons of King Abdul Aziz who has 35 sons; this large family of Ibn Saud hold all key positions in the large kingdom.

Modern history

From the 1940s, Riyadh mushroomed from a relatively narrow, spatially isolated town into a spacious metropolis. When King Saud came to power, he made it his objective to modernize Riyadh, and began developing Annasriyyah, the royal residential district, in 1950. Following the example of American cities, new settlements and entire neighborhoods were created on grid plans, and connected by high-capacity main roads to the inner areas. The grid pattern in the city was introduced in 1953. The population growth of the town from 1974 to 1992 averaged 8.2 percent per year.

al-Qaeda under Osama bin Laden launched coordinated attacks on compounds in Riyadh on 12 May 2003, resulting in the deaths of 39 people. The bombings was considered to be a terrorism campaign against westernisation in Saudi Arabia.

The mayor is Prince Faisal bin Abdulaziz al-Muqrin. Al-Muqrin was appointed in 2019 by royal decree  and succeeds Tariq bin Abdul Aziz Al-Faris. Riyadh is now the administrative and to a great extent the commercial hub of the Kingdom. According to the Saudi Real Estate Companion, most large companies in the country established either sole headquarters or a large office in the city. For this reason, there has been significant growth in high-rise developments in all areas of the city. Most notable among these is King Abdullah Financial District which is fast becoming the key business hub in the city. Riyadh also has the largest all-female university in the world, the Princess Nora bint Abdul Rahman University.

According to the Global Financial Centres Index, Riyadh ranked at 77 in 2016–2017. Though the rank moved up to 69 in 2018, diversification in the economy of the capital is required in order to avoid what the World Bank called a "looming poverty crisis" brought on by lingering low oil prices and rich state benefits.

Since 2017, Riyadh has been the target of missiles from Yemen. In March 2018, one person died as a result of a missile attack. The number of missiles which targeted Riyadh are a small portion of the dozens of missiles fired from Yemen at Saudi Arabia due to the Saudi Arabian-led intervention in Yemen. In April 2018, heavy gunfire was heard in Khozama; this led to rumors of a coup attempt.

Geography

Climate

Riyadh has a hot desert climate (Köppen Climate Classification BWh), with long, extremely hot summers and short, very mild winters. If it was not for the elevation the city was on, Riyadh would experience an even hotter climate. The city experiences very little precipitation, especially in summer, but receives a fair amount of rain in March and April. It is also known to have dust storms during which the dust can be so thick that visibility is under . On 1 and 2 April 2015, a massive dust storm hit Riyadh, causing suspension of classes in many schools in the area and cancellation of hundreds of flights, both domestic and international.

City districts

Riyadh is divided into fourteen branch municipalities, in addition to the Diplomatic Quarter. Each branch municipality in turn contains several districts, amounting to over 130 in total, though some districts are divided between more than one branch municipality. The branch municipalities are Al-Shemaysi, Irqah, Al-Ma'athar, Al-Olayya, Al-Aziziyya, Al-Malaz, Al-Selayy, Nemar, Al-Neseem, Al-Shifa, Al-'Urayja, Al-Bat'ha, Al-Ha'ir, Al-Rawdha, and Al-Shimal ("the North"). Olaya District is the commercial heart of the city, with accommodation, entertainment, dining and shopping options. The Kingdom Centre, Al Faisalyah, and Al-Tahlya Street are the area's most prominent landmarks. The center of the city, Al-Bathaa and Al-Deerah, is also its oldest part.

Some of the main districts of Riyadh are:

 Al-Bat'ha
 Al-Deerah (old Riyadh)
 Mi'kal
 Manfuha
 Manfuha Al-Jadidah (منفوحة الجديدة – "new Manfuha")
 Al-'Oud
 Al-Mansorah
 Al-Margab
 Salam
 Jabrah
 Al-Yamamah
 'Otayyigah
 Al-'Olayya & Sulaymaniyyah
 Al-'Olayya
 Al-Sulaymaniyyah
 Al Izdihar
 King Fahd District
 Al-Masif
 Al-Murooj
 Al-Mugharrazat
 Al-Wurood
 Nemar
 Nemar
 Dharat Nemar
 Tuwaiq
 Hazm
 Deerab
 Irqah
 Irqah
 Al-Khozama
 Diplomatic Quarter
 Al-Shemaysi
 Al-Shemaysi
 Eleyshah
 Al-Badi'ah
 Syah
 Al-Nasriyyah
 Umm Sleym
 Al-Ma'athar
 Umm Al-Hamam (East)
 Al-Ma'athar
 Al-Olayya
 Al-Nakheel
 King Saud University main campus
 Umm Al-Hamam (East)
 Umm Al-Hamam (West)
 Al-Ma'athar Al-Shimali ("North Ma'athar")
 Al-Rahmaniyya
 Al-Muhammadiyya
 Al-Ra'id
 Al-Ha'ir
 Al-Ha'ir
 Al-Ghannamiyyah
 Uraydh
 Al-'Aziziyyah
 Al Aziziyah (Riyadh)
 Ad Dar Al Baida
 Taybah
 Al Mansouriyah
 Al-Malaz
 Al-Malaz
 Al-Rabwah
 Al-Rayyan
 Jarir
 Al-Murabba'
 Sinaiyah Qadeem
 Al-Shifa
 Al-Masani'
 Al-Shifa
 Al-Mansuriyya
 Al-Marwah
 Al-Urayja
 Al-Urayja
 Al-Urayja Al-Wusta ("Mid-Urayja")
 Al-Urayja (West)
 Shubra
 Dharat Laban
 Hijrat Laban
 As-Suwaidi
 As-Suwaidi (West)
 Dahrat Al-Badi'ah
 Sultanah
 Al-Shemal
 Al-Malga
 Al-Sahafa
 Hittin
 Al-Wadi
 Al-Ghadir
 Al-Nafil
 Imam Muhammad ibn Saud University main campus
 Al-Qayrawan
 Al-Aqiq
 Al-Arid
 Al-Naseem
 Al-Naseem (East)
 Al-Naseem (West)
 As-Salam
 Al-Manar
 Al-Rimayah
 Al-Nadheem
 Al-Rawdhah
 Al-Rawdhah
 Al-Qadisiyah
 Al-M'aizliyyah
 Al-Nahdhah
 Gharnatah (Granada)
 Qortubah (Cordoba)
 Al-Andalus (Andalusia)
 Al-Hamra
 Al-Qouds
 Al-Selayy
 Al-Selayy
 Ad Difa'
 Al Iskan
 Khashm Al-'Aan
 Al-Sa'adah
 Al-Fayha
 Al-Manakh
 King Abdullah Financial District

Demographics

The city had a population of 40,000 inhabitants in 1935 and 83,000 in 1949. The city has experienced very high rates of population growth, from 150,000 inhabitants in the 1960s to over seven million, according to the most recent sources. As of 2017, the population of Riyadh is composed of 64.19% Saudis, while non-Saudis account for 35.81% of the population. Indians are the largest minority population at 13.7%, followed by Pakistanis at 12.4%.

Landmarks and architecture

Vernacular architecture of Old Riyadh
The old town of Riyadh within the city walls did not exceed an area of 1 km2, and therefore very few significant architectural remnants of the original walled oasis town of Riyadh exist today. The most prominent is the Masmak fort and some parts of the original wall structure with its gate which have been restored and reconstructed. There are also a number of traditional mud-brick houses within these old limits, but they are for the most part dilapidated.

Expansion outside the city walls was slow to begin with, although there were some smaller oases and settlements surrounding Riyadh. The first major construction beyond the walls was King Abdulaziz's Murabba Palace. It was constructed in 1936, completed in 1938, and a household of 800 people moved into it in 1938. The palace is now part of a bigger complex called The King Abdulaziz Historical Centre.

There are other traditional villages and towns in the area around traditional Riyadh which the urban sprawl reached and encompasses. These include Diriyah, Manfuha and Wadi Laban. Unlike in the early days of development in Riyadh during which vernacular structures were razed to the ground without consideration, there is a new-found appreciation for traditional architecture. The Saudi Commission for Tourism and National Heritage is making efforts to revitalize the historic architecture in Riyadh and other parts of the kingdom.

Ain Heet Cave

Ain Heet cave has an underground lake (150 meters deep) situated at the face of Mount Al Jubayl in Wadi As Sulay in a small village called Heet in Riyadh. Between Riyadh and Al Kharj road, it is one of the easily accessible caves in the area of Riyadh.

Archeological sites

The archeological sites at Riyadh which are of historical importance, in which the Municipality of Riyadh is involved, are the five old gates on the old walls of Riyadh. These are the eastern gate of Thumaira, the northern gate of Al-Suwailen, the southern gate of Dukhna, the western gate of Al-Madhbah, and the south-western gate of Shumaisi. There are also four historic palaces: Musmak Palace, Murabba Palace (palace of King Abdul Aziz), Atiqah Palace (belongs to Prince Muhammad bin Abdul Rahman) and Al Shamsiah Palace (belongs to Saud Al Kabeer).

Turaif district

The Turaif district, is another important archeological site inscribed in UNESCO World Heritage List on 31 July 2010. It was founded in the 15th century bearing an architectural style of Najdi. There are some Historic palaces and monuments in Al-Turaif district include: Salwa Palace, Saad bin Saud Palace, The Guest House and At-Turaif Bath House, and Imam Mohammad bin Saud Mosque.

Masmak Fortress

This fortress was built around 1865 under the reign of Mohammed ibn Abdullah ibn Rasheed (1289-1315 AH), the ruler of Ha'il to the north, who had wrested control of the city from the rival clan of Al Saud. In January 1902 Ibn Saud, who was at the time living in exile in Kuwait, succeeded in capturing the Masmak fortress from its Rashid garrison. The event, which restored Saudi control over Riyadh, has acquired an almost mythical status in the history of Saudi Arabia. The story of the event is often retold and has as its central theme the heroism and bravery of King Abdulaziz al-Saud.
The Masmak Fortress is now a museum and is in close proximity to the Clock Tower Square, also known to English-speaking residents as Chop Chop Square, referring to the capital punishment that takes place there.

Contemporary architecture

Kingdom Centre

Designed by the team of Ellerbe Becket and Omrania, the tower is built on 94,230 square meters of land. The Kingdom Centre is owned by a group of companies including Kingdom Holding Company, headed by Al-Waleed bin Talal, a prince of the Saudi royal family, and is the headquarters of the holding company. The project cost 2 billion Saudi Arabian Riyals and the contract was undertaken by El-Seif. The Kingdom Centre is the winner of the 2002 Emporis Skyscraper Award, selected as the "best new skyscraper of the year for design and functionality". A three-level shopping center, which also won a major design award, fills the east wing. The large opening is illuminated at night in continuously changing colors. The shopping center has a separate floor for women only to shop where men are not allowed to enter.

The Kingdom Tower has 99 stories and is the fifth tallest structure in the country, rising to 300 m. A special aspect of the tower is that it is divided into two parts in the last one-third of its height and is linked by a sky-bridge walkway, which provides extensive views of Riyadh.

Burj Rafal Hotel Kempinski

Burj Rafal, located on King Fahd Road, is the tallest skyscraper in Riyadh at 307.9 meters (1,010 feet) tall. The tower was designed and engineered by P & T Group. Construction began in 2010 and was completed in 2014. The project was considered a success, with 70% of the residential units already sold by the time the skyscraper was topped out. The tower contains 474 residential condominium units and a 349-room 5-star Kempinski hotel.

Burj Al Faisaliyah

Al Faisaliyah Centre (Arabic: برج الفيصلية) is the first skyscraper constructed in Saudi Arabia and is the third tallest building in Riyadh after the Burj Rafal and the Kingdom Centre. The golden ball that lies atop the tower is said to be inspired by a ballpoint pen, and contains a restaurant; immediately below this is an outside viewing deck. There is a shopping center with major world brands at ground level. Al Faisaliyah Centre also has a hotel on both sides of the tower while the main building is occupied by office. The Al Faisaliyah Tower has 44 stories. It was designed by Foster and Partners.

Riyadh TV Tower

The Riyadh TV Tower is a 170 meter high television tower located inside the premises of the Saudi Ministry of Information. It is a vertical cantilever structure which was built between 1978 and 1981. The first movie made in 1983 by the TV tower group and named "1,000 Nights and Night" had Mohammed Abdu and Talal Mmdah as the main characters. At that time, there were no women on TV because of religious restrictions. Three years later, Abdul Khaliq Al-Ghanim produced a TV series called "Tash Ma Tash," which earned a good reaction from audiences in Eastern Arabia. This series created a media revolution back in the 1980s.

Museums and collections

In 1999, a new central museum was built in Riyadh, at the eastern side of the King Abdul Aziz Historical Centre. The National Museum of Saudi Arabia combined several collections and pieces that had up until then been scattered over several institutions and other places in Riyadh and the Kingdom. For example, the meteorite fragment is known as the "Camel's Hump",  recovered in 1966 from the Wabar site, that was on display at the King Saud University in Riyadh became the new entry piece of the National Museum of Saudi Arabia.

The Royal Saudi Air Force Museum, or Saqr Al-Jazira, is located on the East Ring Road of Riyadh between exits 10 and 11. It contains a collection of aircraft and aviation-related items used by the Royal Saudi Air Force and Saudia (Saudi Arabian Airlines).

Sports
Football is the most popular sport in Saudi Arabia. The city hosts four major football clubs, Al Hilal was established in 1957 and has won 15 championships in the Saudi Professional League. Al-Nasr club is another team in the top league that has many supporters around the kingdom. It was established in 1955, and has been named champion of the Saudi League 7 times. Another well-known club, Al-Shabab, was established in 1947 and holds 6 championships. There is also Al-Riyadh Club, which was established in 1954, as well as many other minor clubs.

The city also has several large stadiums such as King Fahd International Stadium with a seating capacity of 70,000. The stadium hosted the FIFA Confederations Cup three times, in the years 1992, 1995 and 1997. It also hosted the FIFA U-20 World Cup in 1989, and Prince Faisal bin Fahd Stadium (Al-Malaz Stadium) that is used mostly for football matches. The stadium has a capacity of 22,500 people.

The city's GPYW Indoor Stadium served as host arena for the 1997 Asian Basketball Championship, where Saudi Arabia's national basketball team reached the Final Four.

On 29 February 2020, the world's richest thoroughbred horse race took place at the King Abdulaziz Racetrack in Riyadh. The Saudi Cup is a new race for thoroughbreds aged four and up, to be run at weight-for-age terms over 1800m (9f). The prize money is US$20m with a prize of US$10m to the winner and prize money down to tenth place. The Saudi Cup is perfectly positioned between the Pegasus World Cup and the Dubai World Cup to attract the best horses from around the world to compete for horse racing's richest prize. Putting the Kingdom of Saudi Arabia on the international horseracing map, the Saudi Cup will also hold an undercard of international races on both dirt and the new turf course.

On 26 April 2020, Saudi Arabia entered the bidding process for the 2030 Asian Games, their main rival for this event was Doha, Qatar. On 16 December 2020, it was announced that Riyadh will host the 2034 Asian Games.

Transportation

Airport

Riyadh's King Khalid International Airport (KKIA), located 35 kilometers north of the city center, is the city's main airport, and serves over 17 million passengers a year. Plans are being made to expand the airport to accommodate 35 million passengers, given that the airport was only built for 12 million passengers annually. A possible new airport is on the table. It is one of the largest airports in the world by land area.

Buses

The main charter bus company in the kingdom, known as the Saudi Public Transport Company (SAPTCO), offers trips both within the kingdom and to its neighboring countries, including Egypt (via ferries from Safaga or Nuweiba) and Arab states of the Gulf Cooperation Council.

Metro
The six line Riyadh Metro is under construction with the first line was expected to open by end of 2021, but now it is expected to open in 2023.

Railways
Saudi Railways Organization operates two separate passenger and cargo lines between Riyadh and Dammam, passing through Hofuf and Haradh. Two future railway projects, connecting Riyadh with Jeddah and Mecca in the western region, and connecting Riyadh with Buraidah, Ha'il and Northern Saudi Arabia are underway.

Roads
The city is served by a major highway system. The main Eastern Ring Road connects the city's south and north, while the Northern Ring Road connects the city's east and west. King Fahd Road runs through the center of the city from north to south, in parallel with the East Ring Road. Makkah Road, which runs east–west across the city's center, connects eastern parts of the city with the city's main business district and the diplomatic quarters.

Media

The  Riyadh TV Tower, operated by the Ministry of Information, was built between 1978 and 1981.
National Saudi television channels Saudi TV1, Saudi TV2, Saudi TV Sports, Al-Ekhbariya, ART channels network operate from here. Television broadcasts are mainly in Arabic, although some radio broadcasts are in English or French. Arabic is the main language used in television and radio but radio broadcasts are also made in different languages such as Urdu, French, or English. Riyadh has four Arabic newspapers; Asharq Al-Awsat (which is owned by the city governor), Al Riyadh, Al Jazirah and Al-Watan, two English language newspapers; Saudi Gazette and Arab News, and one Malayalam language newspaper, Gulf Madhyamam.

Development projects
In 2019, King Salman launched a plan to implement 1281 development projects in Riyadh. The project is planned to cost around US$22 billion. The main goal of the plan is to improve the infrastructure, transportation, environment and other facilities in Riyadh and the surrounding area. In the framework of Saudi Vision 2030, the plan will take care of constructing 15 housing projects, building a huge museum, establishing an environmental project, sports areas, medical cities, educational facilities, etc. This includes the establishment of 14 electricity projects, 20 sewage projects, 10 housing areas, 66 trading and industrial areas, a number of lakes covering 315,000 square meters, and advanced sports cities. Alongside the development project and in the aim of enhancing the artistic movement of the city, 1000 pieces of art are planned to be publicly displayed in the city by the end of 2030. In the framework of Riyadh's development projects, an amount of SR 604 million has been awarded to develop and construct roads of Riyadh. On 3 July 2020, Bloomberg reported that Saudi Arabia has allocated $20 billion on the mega-project of tourism and culture in Riyadh namely, "Diriyah Gate", while facing a double economic crisis after rise in coronavirus cases.

The Ministry of Investment and the Royal Commission for Riyadh City (RCRC) announced on 13 July 2021 that they have partnered with SEK Education Group to open SEK International School Riyadh, its first campus in Saudi Arabia. The new international school will welcome students from Pre-K (age 3 years) to Grade 12 (age 17/18 years), and will become one of the few schools in Riyadh accredited to offer the International Baccalaureate (IB) Primary Years Programme (PYP), Middle Years Programme (MYP), and Diploma Programme (DP).

Events and festivals

Jenadriyah
Jenadriyah is an annual festival that has been held in Riyadh. It hosts a number of cultural and traditional events, such as camel race, poetry reading and others.

Riyadh International Book Fair
It is one of the largest book fairs in the MENA region. It is usually held between March and April and it hosts a wide range of Saudi, Arab and international publishers.

Riyadh Season
In the framework of the recent Saudi endeavor to promote tourism in the country, Riyadh Season was held as part of the Saudi Seasons initiative. The season took place in October 2019 and lasted until December 2019. It hosted a wide range of sports, musical, theatrical, fashion shows, circus, and various other entertainment activities. Some of Riyadh Season events are BTS concert, Joy convention and Joy Expo, Ice Rink, WWE Events, Arabian concerts, Egyptian Theater, League of Legends, Real Madrid Interactive Expo and Ferrari Festival.

Noor Riyadh
Noor Riyadh (Noor meaning light in Arabic) is an annual festival and one of the four major projects under the mandate of the Royal Commission for Riyadh City. It is the festival of light and art. In 2021, the festival will be launched on 18 March and will last until 3 April.

References

Bibliography

External links

 
 
دليل الرياض - الدليل السعودي

 
Capitals in Asia
Populated places in Riyadh Province
Provincial capitals of Saudi Arabia
Burial sites of the House of Saud
Populated places with period of establishment missing